Charles Maurice Lisner OBE (1928 - 1988) was a French-Australian dancer and the founder and first artistic director of the Queensland Ballet.

Early life 
Charles Lisner was born in Paris, France. Lisner emigrated to Australia with his parents in 1937.  He started dancing late in life, in his early twenties, and traveled to London where he spent time with the Sadler's Wells Ballet. He later joined the Royal Ballet, Covent Garden.

Creation of Lisner Ballet Academy and Queensland Ballet 
In 1953, Lisner returned to Queensland after the death of his father, and established the Lisner Ballet Academy with virtually no money. From that academy grew Lisner's privately owned company, the Lisner Ballet, which was established in 1960.  In 1962, the name was changed to the Queensland Ballet.  Lisner stepped down as Artistic Director and Chief Executive Officer of the company in 1974.

Lisner married Valerie, one of his dancers. He was an uncredited dancer  in the film, The Red Shoes (1948) 

Queensland Ballet studio seasons are performed in The Charles Lisner Studio Theatre of the Thomas Dixon Centre.

He was appointed OBE in the 1976 New Year Honours.

Many photographs of the academy were taken by Grahame Garner, as a regular photographer for the Queensland Guardian newspaper. 911 negatives from his collection of the Lisner Academy were lodged with the National Library of Australia in 2009.

Bibliography
 My Journey through Dance (1979)  (autobiography)
 The Australian Ballet: Twenty-one years (1983)

References

External links 
Queensland Ballet

Australian male ballet dancers
Ballet teachers
Australian Officers of the Order of the British Empire
1928 births
1988 deaths
French emigrants to Australia